Disseminated coccidioidomycosis is a systemic infection with Coccidioides immitis, in which 15-20% of people develop skin lesions.

See also 
 Coccidioidomycosis
 List of cutaneous conditions

References 

Mycosis-related cutaneous conditions